Adrián Szekeres (born 21 April 1989 in Budapest) is a retired Hungarian football player.

Club statistics

Honours

 FIFA U-20 World Cup:
 Third place: 2009

References

External links

 UEFA
 Hungarian Football Federation
 

1989 births
Living people
Footballers from Budapest
Hungarian footballers
Hungary youth international footballers
Hungary under-21 international footballers
Association football defenders
Újpest FC players
MTK Budapest FC players
Fehérvár FC players
Puskás Akadémia FC players
Dunaújváros PASE players
Gyirmót FC Győr players
Nemzeti Bajnokság I players